Lakdikapul railway station is a railway station located in Hyderabad, Telangana, India. Localities like Red Hills, Public Gardens and Masab Tank are accessible from this station.

The overbridge (pul in Hindi) constructed with the wood (lakdi in Hindi) at the station, for pedestrians is historic. Hence, the area became famous as lakdi-ka-pul.

Lines
Hyderabad Multi-Modal Transport System
Secunderabad–Falaknuma route (SF Line)

References

External links
MMTS Timings as per South Central Railway

MMTS stations in Hyderabad